Etawah is a municipality in Uttar Pradesh, India.

Etawah can also refer to:
 Etawah District, district surrounding the municipality
 Etawah (Lok Sabha constituency), constituency in the Lok Sabha
 Etawah railway station
 Etawah Gharana, a musical lineage founded by Imdad Khan 
 Etawah Wildlife Safari Park, planned drive-through wildlife park in Etawah

See also
 Etowah (disambiguation)